"Wrong for Each Other" is a song written by Doc Pomus and Mort Shuman and performed by Andy Williams.  The song reached #11 on the U.S. adult contemporary chart and #34 on the Billboard chart in 1964.

References

1964 singles
Songs with lyrics by Doc Pomus
Songs with music by Mort Shuman
Andy Williams songs
Columbia Records singles
1964 songs